Goran Grkinić (Serbian Cyrillic: Горан Гркинић; born 1 June 1979) is a Serbian football defender who spent most of his career with Zemun.

By September 2014 he has been the sports director of Serbian SuperLiga club Voždovac.

References

External links

1979 births
Living people
People from Paraćin
Serbian footballers
Association football defenders
FK Zemun players
Ethnikos Achna FC players
Kecskeméti TE players
FK Senica players
Nemzeti Bajnokság I players
Cypriot First Division players
Serbian expatriate footballers
Expatriate footballers in Cyprus
Expatriate footballers in Hungary
Expatriate footballers in Slovakia
Serbian expatriate sportspeople in Cyprus
Serbian expatriate sportspeople in Hungary
Serbian expatriate sportspeople in Slovakia